The Special Forces Command is a division of the Turkish Armed Forces, initially established as a brigade in 14 April 1992, operating directly under the Turkish General Staff.  According to the Turkish Armed Forces (TAF) dress code, the OKK, also known as the Bordo Bereliler, are noteworthy for their distinctive maroon berets. Their task is to carry out special operations that exceed the capabilities of other military units.

History
First established on 27 September 1952 as the Special and Auxiliary Combat Troops, the OKK was renamed Mobilization Investigation Board in November 1953. On 14 December 1970, it was reorganized as the Special Warfare Department. Due to the emergence of external dangers after the Gulf War and threats from the northern part of Iraq, the Special Forces Command was established as a brigade on 14 April 1992. In 2006, the brigade transitioned to a division. OKK leadership was upgraded from major-general to lieutenant-general and the new division was split into the 1st and 2nd brigade with the expectation that the troop count would double from 7000 to 14,000 by 2009. They ranked first among twenty-six special forces troops at the World Special Forces Championship held in Germany in 2004.

In 1998, Turkey's special forces intercepted a warning intended for the PKK team in Iraq, infiltrated PKK operations and captured the commander of Kurdistan Democratic Party's (PKK) military forces, Şemdin Sakık. In 1999, the Turkish Special Forces used technology given to them by the Netherlands to arrest Abdullah Öcalan, a founding member of the PKK, after he landed at the Nairobi airport in Kenya. In 2014, after 49 consular employees were taken hostage by ISIS in Mosul, Special Forces Command carried out joint operations with MIT, the Turkish National Intelligence Organization, and rescued the hostages. Special Forces Command took part in internal security operations during the 2015-2016 curfews in the Southeastern Anatolia Region, Furthermore, on 21 February 2015 they participated in Operation Shah Euphrates to relocate the tomb of Suleyman Shah in Syria. With the start of the operations in Syria against ISIS and PYD in 2016 during Operation Euphrates Shield, the Special Forces Command infiltrated the region and carried out exploration activities supported by the Free Syrian Army. Special Forces Command also played a role in operations such as Operation Olive Branch, Operation Claw (2019–2020), Operation Peace Spring and Operations Claw-Eagle and Tiger.

The identities of Turkish Special Forces Command personnel are classified. Turkish SOF Officers are battle hardened, constantly operating and are active in the war on the PKK in the southeastern border region of Turkey and northern Iraq.

Attempted coup d'état
A key figure of the 2016 Turkish coup d'état attempt was brigadier general Semih Terzi, who was Deputy Commander of the Special Forces at the time and the highest-ranking field commander during the coup attempt. He led a team of roughly 40 special forces operatives in an attempt to secure Special Forces Headquarters and organize attacks against government agencies and the parliament. The attempt ended in failure when OKK Senior Sergeant major Ömer Halisdemir shot and killed Terzi, disrupting the command of the rebels.

Organization
The Special Forces are not aligned to any of the three branches of the TAF. They receive orders directly from the General Staff of the Republic of Turkey. The official size of the Special Forces Command (OKK), which is publicly known as Red Berets, stands at a Division level, this includes non-combatant units and other support staff. The combatant size of the OKK is not greater than 500.

Special Aviation Group
Special Aviation Group provides helicopter support for the Command's missions. The helicopters were modernized in 2015 and can operate at night or during the day.

Training and recruitment
ÖKK recruits officers, NCOs and SNCOs almost exclusively from the Land Forces Command, Turkey's army branch. Volunteers must pass written and physical exams, and linguistic skills in at least one foreign language are beneficial toward admission. 

The OKK training period lasts around 3.5 years, and encompasses: unconventional warfare and various special warfare types, special operations, special reconnaissance and infiltration, covert operations, psychological warfare, underwater operation, static parachute and HALO (night and day jump), counter-terrorism in residential areas, close-quarters combat, resisting torture and interrogation techniques, ambush, raid, sabotage, escape, VIP protection, marksmanship, intelligence, languages, survival, operation in deep snow, extreme weather, bomb disposal, demolition, fire arrangement, damage detection, and TCCC.

Recruits must undergo:
Domestic training (72 weeks)
International training (10 to 52 weeks, depending on rank)
Specialty training

After graduating from Special Operations Training, commandos are tested before they officially become Maroon Beret officers. They are expected to survive in all environmental conditions, so as part of the final testing stage teams of recruits are left in different environments for two weeks, with no equipment or help.

On the last month of training, called the "hell month", Maroon Berets receive training in interrogation and torture, and undertake a Trust Shot (Turkish: Güven Atışı) exercise. Those flanking the targets are not permitted to move or wear body armor.

Equipment

Source:

See also
 List of military special forces units

References

Further reading

Lale Sariibrahimoglu, 'Live-fire exercises shine spotlight on Turkey's special forces,' Jane's Defence Weekly, 7 January 2004

Special forces of Turkey
Military units and formations of Turkey